Chlorocytus is a genus of wasps belonging to the family Pteromalidae.

The species of this genus are found in Europe, Northern America and Southern Africa.

Species

Species within the genus Chlorocytus include:

Chlorocytus agropyri 
Chlorocytus alticornis 
Chlorocytus analis 
Chlorocytus leleji

References

Pteromalidae
Hymenoptera genera